Lysine-specific demethylase 5A is an enzyme that in humans is encoded by the KDM5A gene.

Function 

The protein encoded by this gene is a ubiquitously expressed nuclear protein. It binds directly, with several other proteins, to retinoblastoma protein which regulates cell proliferation. It was formerly known as Retinoblastoma Binding Protein 2 (RBP2). This protein also interacts with rhombotin-2 which functions distinctly in erythropoiesis and in T-cell leukemogenesis. Rhombotin-2 is thought to either directly affect the activity of the encoded protein or may indirectly modulate the functions of the retinoblastoma protein by binding to this protein. Alternatively spliced transcript variants encoding distinct isoforms have been found for this gene.

The Drosophila homolog, LID, was found to be an H3K4 histone demethylase that binds to c-Myc. It was recently renamed to Lysine Demethylase 5 (KDM5).

Enzymatically can be designated as a trimethyllysine dioxygenase, which is a member of the alpha-ketoglutarate-dependent hydroxylase superfamily.

Interactions 

JARID1A has been shown to interact with Estrogen receptor alpha, LMO2 and Retinoblastoma protein.

JARID1A is a major component of the circadian clock, the upregulation of which at the end of the sleep phase blocks HDAC1 activity. Blocking HDAC1 activity results in an upregulation of CLOCK and BMAL1 and consequent upregulation of PER proteins. The PSF (polypyrimidine tract-binding protein-associated splicing factor) within the PER complex recruits SIN3A, a scaffold for assembly of transcriptional inhibitory complexes and rhythmically delivers histone deacetylases to the Per1 promoter, which repress Per1 transcription.

Knockdown of JARID1A promoted osteogenic differentiation of human adipose-derived stromal cells in vitro and in vivo and resulted in marked increases of mRNA expression of osteogenesis-associated genes such as alkaline phosphatase (ALP), osteocalcin (OC), and osterix (OSX). RBP2 was shown to occupy the promoters of OSX and OC to maintain the level of the H3K4me3 mark by chromatin immunoprecipitation assays. RBP2 was also physically and functionally associated with RUNX2, an essential transcription factor that governed osteoblastic differentiation. RUNX2 knockdown impaired the repressive activity of RBP2 in osteogenic differentiation of human adipose-derived stromal cells.

References

Further reading

External links 
 

Transcription factors
Human 2OG oxygenases
EC 1.14.11